Japelaq District is a district (bakhsh) in Azna County, Lorestan Province, Iran. At the 2006 census, its population was 11,782, in 2,978 families.  The District has two Rural Districts (dehestan): Japelaq-e Gharbi Rural District and Japelaq-e Sharqi Rural District. The District has one city: Momenabad.

References 

Districts of Lorestan Province
Azna County